"Redneck 12 Days of Christmas" is a redneck parody of "The Twelve Days of Christmas" written by Jeff Foxworthy and Tim Wilson and recorded by Foxworthy on his 1996 album Crank It Up: The Music Album. The song reached number 18 on the Billboard Hot Country Singles & Tracks chart in January 1996, becoming the highest-charting seasonal title of the SoundScan era, a record that has since been tied by Jimmy Wayne's "Paper Angels." It subsequently peaked at number 39 in January 1997, number 39 in January 1998, number 37 in January 1999 and number 35 in January 2000.

The song's B-side, "'Twas the Night After Christmas", peaked at number 67 on the Billboard Hot Country Singles & Tracks chart in January 1997.

Music video
The music video was directed by Michael McNamara and premiered in November 1996.

Chart performance

References

1995 singles
Jeff Foxworthy songs
Warner Records singles
American Christmas songs
Musical parodies
Christmas novelty songs